This is a list of defunct newspapers of Quebec.

1770–1799 
 La Gazette du commerce et littéraire pour la Ville & District de Montréal, 1778, Montréal, Fleury Mesplet, printer, and Valentin Jautard, editor and journalist
 La Gazette de Montréal/The Montreal Gazette, 1785, Montréal, Fleury Mesplet, printer
 Le Courier de Québec ou héraut francois, 1788, Quebec City, William Moore, editor, and James Tanswell, collaborator
 Quebec Herald and Universal Miscellany, 1788, Quebec City, William Moore, editor, and James Tanswell, collaborator
 Le Magasin de Quebec/The Quebec Magazine, 1792, Quebec City, Samuel Neilson, printer and editor
 Le Cours du tems, 1794, Quebec City, John Jones and William Vondenvelden

1800–1819 
 The British American Register, 1802, Quebec City, John Neilson, owner and publisher
 Quebec Mercury, 1804, Quebec City, Thomas Cary, owner
 L'Almanach des dames, 1806, Louis Plamondon, editor
 Le Canadien 1806, Quebec City, Pierre Bédard, François Blanchet and Jean-Thomas Taschereau
 Courier de Québec, 1807, Quebec City, Pierre-Amable de Bonne and Joseph-François Perrault, founders, Pierre-Édouard Desbarats, printer, Jacques Labrie, editor
 Canadian courant and Montreal Advertiser, 1807, Montréal, Nahum Mower, owner and editor
 La Gazette canadienne/The Canadian Gazette, 1807, Montréal, Charles Brown, publisher and James Brown, editor
 Le Vrai Canadien, 1810, Quebec City, Pierre-Amable de Bonne
 The Montreal Herald, 1811, Montréal, William Gray and Mungo Kay, founders, owners and publishers
 Le Spectateur canadien 1815, Charles-Bernard Pasteur, owner, editor and publisher
 The Canadian Inspector, 1815, Montréal, Nahum Mower, publisher
 The Quebec Telegraph, 1816
 L'Aurore, 1817, Montréal, Michel Bibaud and Joseph Victor Delorme
 Gazette des Trois-Rivières, 1817, Trois-Rivières, Ludger Duvernay, founder, printer and editor
 L'Abeille canadienne, 1818, Montréal, Henri-Antoine Mézière
 Le Courrier du Bas-Canada, Montréal, 1819, Joseph Victor Delorme, founder, printer, and Michel Bibaud, editor journalist

1820–1829 
 L'Ami de la religion et du roi, 1820, Trois-Rivières, Ludger Duvernay
 The Enquirer, 1821, Quebec City
 The Scribbler, 1821, Montréal, Samuel Hull Wilcocke, owner and editor, J. Lame, printer
 La Gazette canadienne, 1822, Montréal, Jonh Quilliam
 The Canadian Spectator, 1822, John Jones, editor, Jocelyn Waller, journalist
 The Canadian Times and Weekly Literary and Political Reporter, 1823, Ariel Bowman, printer, Edward Vernon Sparhawk, editor
 Christian Register, 1823, Montréal
 British Colonist and St-Françis Gazette, 1823, Stanstead, S. H. Dickerson
 Le Constitutionnel, 1823, Ludger Duvernay, owner, editor and journalist
 The Canadian Magazine and Literary Repository, 1823, Montréal, Joseph Nickless, owner, David Chisholmes and Alexander James Christie, directors
 The Canadian Review and Literary and Historical Journal, 1824, Montréal, Henry H. Cunningham, owner, David Chisholmes, director
 La Bibliothèque canadienne, ou miscellanées historiques, scientifiques et littéraires 1825, Montréal, Michel Bibaud and Joseph-Marie Bellenger
 La Minerve, 1826, Montréal, Augustin-Norbert Morin, founder, owner, printer and journalist
 L'Argus, Journal electorique, 1826, Trois-Rivières, Ludger Duvernay
 La Gazette de Saint-Philippe, 1826, Saint-Philippe-de-Laprairie, F-X Pigeon, founder
 Journal de médecine de Québec, 1826, Quebec City, Xavier Tessier
 The Christian Sentinel and Anglo-Canadian Churchman's Magazine, 1827
 L'Électeur-The Elector, 1827, François Lemaître
 The Irish Vindicator and Canada General Advertiser, 1828, Montréal, Daniel Tracey, founder, editor, printer and journalist
 Journal des sciences naturelles, 1828, Quebec City, maybe Xavier Tessier
 Le coin du feu, 1829, Montréal,  Madame Raoul Dandurand, founder & editor; Jacques Labrie and Augustin-Norbert Morin

1830–1839 
 L'Observateur 1830, Michel Bibaud, Ludger Duvernay, printer
 Le Magasin du Bas-Canada, Journal littéraire et scientifique 1832, Montréal, Michel Bibaud, Ludger Duvernay, printer
 L'Ami du peuple, de l'ordre et des lois 1832, Montréal, the sulpiciens, John Jones, Pierre-Édouard Leclère
 Montreal Vindicator, 1832, Montréal, Édouard-Raymond Fabre, owner, Edmund Bailey O'Callaghan, journalist
 The Montreal Museum or Journal of Literature and Arts, 1832, Montréal, Mary Graddon Gosselin, editor, Ludger Duvernay, printer
 L'Écho du pays, 1833, Saint-Charles, Pierre-Dominique Debartzch, founder, Alfred-Xavier Rambau, journalist
 L'Abeille canadienne, 1833, Quebec City, François-Xavier Garneau, founder, editor and J-B Fréchette, printer
 L'Impartial, 1834, Laprairie
 Le Glaneur, journal littéraire, d’agriculture et d’industrie, 1836, Saint-Charles (replaces L'Écho du pays)
 Le Télégraphe, 1836, Quebec City, Phillipe-Ignace François Aubert de Gaspé and Napoléon Aubin, founders and editors
 Le Populaire, 1837, Montréal, Clément-Charles Sabrevois de Bleury, Léon Gosselin, Pierre-Dominique Debartzch, Hyacinthe Leblanc de Marconnay, chief editor
 Le Fantasque, 1837, Quebec City, Napoléon Aubin, founder and editor
 Le Libéral, 1837, Quebec City
 La Quotidienne, 1837, Montréal, François Lemaître
 Le Temps, 1838, Montréal
 The Literary Garland, 1838, Montréal
 L'Aurore des Canadas, Journal littéraire, politique et commercial, 1839, Montréal, Joseph-Guillaume Barthe, editor

1840–1899 
 L'Avenir, 1847
 Le Pays, 1852
 Canadian Illustrated News, Montreal, 1869
 The Montreal Evening Star, later The Montreal Star, 1869
 Le Cultivateur, Quebec City, 1974
 The Gazette Megantic Edition, Inverness, 1899–1911

1900–1989 
 Le Nationaliste, 1904
 Montreal Standard, 1905–1951 (became Weekend)
 Le Cri de l'Est, Matane, 1911
 The Monitor, Montreal, 1926 (converted to online-only in 2009)
 L'Illustration, 1930, Montréal (also known as L'Illustration Nouvelle and Montréal-Matin)
Dimanche-Matin, 1954, Montreal
Sunday Express, circa 1973, Montreal
 Le Jour, 1974, Saint-Laurent
Montreal Daily News, 1988, Montreal

References 
 http://www.unites.uqam.ca/arche/alaq/index.php?nomLien=603
 http://www.bib.umontreal.ca/CS/livre-savant/imprime/
 https://web.archive.org/web/20060505231757/http://www.lac-bac.gc.ca/8/18/r18-215-e.html

Newspapers, defunct

Defunct, Quebec
Quebec